The Illinizas are a pair of volcanic mountains that are located in the north of Latacunga, Cotopaxi, Ecuador. They are located in the Illinizas Ecological Reserve. These twin mountains are separated by a saddle that is about a kilometer long. The peaks are among the highest in Ecuador, with Illiniza Sur standing slightly taller than Illiniza Norte, its northern counterpart, at 5245 metres and 5126 metres respectively.

Most guidebooks (for example, Lonely Planet Ecuador, Ecuador: A Climbing Guide) spell the mountain with only one "l" as in Iliniza. The name Illinizas is derived from the Kunza words for "masculine hill."

Whilst Illiniza Sur (the southern peak) is a more difficult climb due to its glacial nature, Illiniza Norte requires some climbing expertise, and may be climbed as a trekking peak. A guide is still recommended, however, as the path becomes hard to navigate as it approaches the summit.

The Illinizas are excellent mountains for acclimatization to altitude, and are frequently used as a preparatory climb to higher peaks such as Cotopaxi, Chimborazo and Cayambe.

There is a rustic refuge located between the north and south peaks. It can be reached in one hour by car from El Chaupi, followed by a three-hour climb. The refuge has gas stoves, pots and pans and bunk beds. It is necessary to bring warm sleeping bags and food, but water is available to be boiled.

The Englishman Edward Whymper tried and failed twice to make the first ascent of Iliniza Sur. It was climbed for the first time in 1880 by his two Italian guides Jean-Antoine Carrel and Louis Carrel. The first ascent of Iliniza Norte was made in 1912 by the Ecuadorians Nicolás Martínez and Alejandro Villavicencio.

See also

 List of volcanoes in Ecuador

References

External links
 Climbing Trip Report

Stratovolcanoes of Ecuador
Andean Volcanic Belt
Subduction volcanoes
Potentially active volcanoes
Holocene stratovolcanoes
Quaternary South America
Five-thousanders of the Andes